An Iso, short for isolation and also known as a Halfback Lead, is a simple run play in American Football which is designed to isolate the fullback on a lead block with a linebacker, giving the halfback an easy 5 yards. Meanwhile, the other linebackers are blocked on combo blocks from the offensive line. It is one of the most commonly run concepts in football, and is useful in most situations.

Types/variants 
Iso plays are almost always run out of I formations due to the fact that they require a fullback, however, coaches have developed many ways to run them.

Quarterback Iso 
The quarterback iso is a recently developed variant of the iso that is run out of shotgun and pistol formations. Often seen at the youth and high school levels of football, it takes advantage of mobile quarterbacks and uses the halfback as the lead blocker rather than a fullback. It is successful against defenses that put a limited number of players in the box.

Requirements 
The play requires a fullback to be successful, and is therefore almost always run out of I-formations. It helps if the defense is spread across the field, as that makes the combo blocks from the offensive line easier to execute.

References 

American football plays